Nelson Province was constituted in 1853 under the New Zealand Constitution Act 1852, and originally covered the entire upper South Island, including all of present-day Buller, Kaikoura, Marlborough, and Tasman districts, along with Nelson City, Grey District north of the Grey River, and the Hurunui District north of the Hurunui River. It was reduced in size by the creation of Marlborough Province in November 1859, then abolished in 1876, along with all the provinces of New Zealand.

Area

Nelson Province initially covered the entire upper South Island. The Marlborough Province split away from the Nelson Province on 1 November 1859 because the majority of the income of the Provincial Council came from land sales in the Marlborough region, but the funds were mostly used in the Nelson region. Land sales in Nelson and Marlborough netted the Nelson Provincial Council £33,000 and £160,000, respectively. Of that, £200 were expended benefiting the Marlborough region. There was considerable conflict between Superintendent John Perry Robinson's policies of supporting smaller land holders, and the objectives of the large pastoral run-holders in the Wairau Valley. The New Provinces Act 1858 allowed for parts of a province to break away if the area was large enough, and enough voters supported such a move. The petition was signed by almost all settlers in the Wairau; only six withholding their support for a split. The new Marlborough Province was gazetted on 4 October 1859.

For perspective, the Marlborough Province took with it the areas of Nelson Province that would later form five administrative areas when the provinces were dissolved in 1876: Blenheim Borough, covering ; Picton Borough, covering ; Kaikoura County, covering ; and Marlborough County, covering , which includes the former Sounds County, the area immediately surrounding the borough of Picton, which amalgamated with Marlborough County prior to 1913 due to insufficient population to ever form its own county council.

History

The Nelson Provincial Council was established with fifteen members, and the Province was divided into seven Electoral Districts for the election of the Superintendent and members of the Provincial Council. These districts were: Town of Nelson, five members; Suburban Districts, one member; Waimea East District, two members; Waimea West District, one member; Waimea South District, two members; Motueka and Massacre Bay District, two members; Wairau District, two members.
 
The election of Nelson's first superintendent was contested by three candidates; Edward Stafford, Francis Jollie and John Waring Saxton. The election took place on 1 August 1853 and resulted in Edward Stafford being Nelson's first superintendent. The final results for the election were: Stafford (251), Saxton (206) and Jollie (130). Edward Stafford will be remembered for his free, secular and compulsory education system became the model for New Zealand, with this ‘Nelson system’ introduced to all state primary schools in 1877.

Nelson was the designated seat of government and Superintendent John Perry Robinson laid the foundation stone for the Provincial Government buildings in Nelson on 26 August 1859. The building was in Albion Square in Bridge Street. It was designed by visiting architect Maxwell Bury and he modeled it on Aston Hall near Birmingham. Whereas Aston Hall was built from stone, the Government buildings were from timber. The buildings were run down and had stood empty for some years when they were demolished in 1969, amidst much controversy. The Nelson District Court building now stands on the site.

During the First Taranaki War in 1860 nearly 1,200 Taranaki settlers including women and children were relocated to Nelson. The Nelson Provincial Council funded the building of cottages known as the "Taranaki Buildings" for the housing of these refugees. Upon the cessation of hostilities the war refugees were offered free passage back to Taranaki, the majority took advantage of this offer but some elected to remain in Nelson.

During the period 1853 to 1873, the area that would become Grey County was administered as part of both Nelson Province and Canterbury Province (the Canterbury portion was transferred to a newly created Westland Province in 1873). The boundary between the provinces had been set as a straight line from the head of the Hurunui River to Lake Brunner at a time when the area was virtually uninhabited, but the West Coast Gold Rush then straddled that boundary, with a population boom also straddling the boundary. In 1866, there had been a proposal for the portions in Canterbury Province, including the urban area of Greymouth and the rural area south, to be annexed and solely administered by Nelson Province.

Abolition
Nelson Province was abolished under the Abolition of Provinces Act 1875, with its former area then being administered by a number of newly constituted boroughs and counties, effective 1 January 1877.

Anniversary day
New Zealand law provides for a provincial anniversary day.

Superintendents

The Nelson Province had four Superintendents:

Elected members

Legislation
 Nelson Education Act 1856
 Nelson Improvement Act 1856
 Nelson Institution Act 1859
 Nelson Waterworks Act 1863
 Nelson Waterworks Act Amendment Act 1875

Subordinate boards
 Nelson Central Board of Education
 Nelson Board of Works

Adjacent provinces
 Marlborough Province – northeast
 Canterbury Province – southeast
 Westland Province – southwest

See also
 Nelson-Marlborough Regional Council

References

External links
 Nelson Province and Provincial District
 The Seal of Nelson Province
 Nelson and Marlborough Provinces Map
 Nelson Provincial Ordinances

Provinces of New Zealand
States and territories established in 1853
1876 disestablishments in New Zealand
1853 establishments in New Zealand